Catriona Fallon is a former American rower. She won the World Championships in 1995 and finished 4th in the women's eight at the 1996 Summer Olympics.

Fallon received an M.B.A. from Harvard Business School and a B.A. in Economics from UCLA. Following her retirement from rowing, she has pursued a career in business.

References 
 
 
https://www.silverspringnet.com/article/press-release/silver-spring-networks-announces-catriona-fallon-chief-financial-officer/
https://globenewswire.com/news-release/2017/12/18/1263661/0/en/Cray-Appoints-Catriona-Fallon-to-Board-of-Directors.html

1970 births
Living people
People from Burlingame, California
Rowers at the 1996 Summer Olympics
Olympic rowers of the United States
World Rowing Championships medalists for the United States
American female rowers
Pan American Games medalists in rowing
Pan American Games silver medalists for the United States
University of California, Los Angeles alumni
Harvard Business School alumni
Rowers at the 1991 Pan American Games
21st-century American women